General Markov may refer to:

Sergey Markov (1878–1918), Imperial Russian Army general
Valentin Markov (1910–1992), Soviet Air Force lieutenant general
Vladimir Markov (politician) (1859–1919), Finnish-born Imperial Russian Army lieutenant general
Yevgeni Ivanovich Markov (1769–1828), Imperial Russian Army lieutenant general